Poco... Little Dog Lost is a 1977 American independent family adventure drama film about a young girl, Kim (Michelle Ashburn), and her dog, Poco.

Plot
Early in the film, both Kim and her mother are injured in a car accident. An emergency medical crew arrives to help them and bring them to the hospital. But Kim's dog, Poco, gets spooked during the commotion and runs off into the desert.

Lost in the dangerous wilds, Poco treks across the wilderness in search of Kim. As Kim recovers, she searches for Poco as well.

Poco has several adventures as he makes his way through scenic, diverse, and occasionally treacherous California terrain, from the high desert, the Sierra Nevada mountains, a ghost town, and a romp through Yosemite National Park. The dog also has several encounters along the way, including a kind old gas station owner (John Steadman) and a benevolent gold prospector (Chill Wills), as well as a few other animal friends, all of whom help Poco on his journey home.

Cast 
 Chill Wills as Big Burt
 Michelle Ashburn as Kim
 Muffin as Poco
 Sherry Bain as Mrs. McKinna
 Clint Ritchie as Mr. McKinna
 Ysabel MacCloskey
 John Steadman as Ben Ashton
 Dran Hamilton		
 Tom Roy Lowe
 Jeanne Bates as Mrs. John Ashmore
 Robert Broyles as Deputy
 Mikki Jamison Olsen as Jane
 Jim Schlievert as Ranger
 Michael L. Harris as Hold-Up Man
 Shannon Farnon as Nurse

Filming
Filming locations include Yosemite National Park; the ghost town of Bodie, California; the Mono Lake area; the Owens Valley; the sand dunes in Death Valley, California and Sacramento International Airport in Sacramento, California.

Muffin, the dog who plays the title character of Poco, also appeared in the television series CHiPs, in the Season 1, Episode 3 episode entitled "Dog Gone."

References

External links
Poco... Little Dog Lost at IMDB

1977 films
1970s adventure films
Films about dogs
American children's films
1970s English-language films
1970s American films